Elias Poutanen (also known by his alias Olmoor) is a former host/computer-game critic. He has worked for the magazine Pelaaja  and for a number of related television programmes. Though officially a Finnish citizen, he was born in Australia.

He started out as the replacement for Thomas Puha who previously hosted the programme called Play on MoonTV. The name of the show was changed to Player during this transition. He became noted by some fans as the channel's cute nerd. He remained the official host for all console-gaming involved shows until MoonTV's cancellation in the early summer of 2003.

After MoonTV's demise, Poutanen appeared only abruptly on television. Though he resurfaced as a critic on the show Play on Nelonen, hosted by former MoonTV personnel, Thomas Puha and Miika Huttunen. Towards the end of the show's run in 2005, Poutanen ended up replacing the show's female hosts who became either sick or unavailable for other reasons. Throughout its second season, Play's ratings were not promising and as the show's cancellation became evident, Poutanen was made its permanent host for the remaining last episodes.

On the final episode, he interviewed Jarno Sarkula, another former MoonTV host and game-critic.

References

Finnish television presenters
Year of birth missing (living people)
Living people